Puerto Rico Highway 186 (PR-186) is a road that travels from Canóvanas, Puerto Rico to Río Grande through the western side of El Yunque National Forest. This highway begins at PR-185 between Hato Puerco and Lomas barrios and ends at PR-3 in Guzmán Abajo.

Major intersections

See also

 List of highways numbered 186
 Forest highway

References

External links
 

186